AAPC  may refer to:

 AAPC (formerly the American Academy of Professional Coders), a professional organization for healthcare business professionals in the United States.
 Additive/Abradable Powder Coatings, see Abradable powder coatings
 African Auxiliary Pioneer Corps, military unit, British Empire
 All-African Peoples' Conference
 Allied Artists Pictures Corporation, the former name of a Hollywood film studio 
 American Association of Pastoral Counselors, a professional association of pastoral counselors
 American Association of Political Consultants, the trade group of the political consulting profession in the United States
 American Automotive Policy Council, American automobile trade group of Ford, Chrysler, and General Motors
 Artificial antigen presenting cells
 Association des architectes paysagistes du Canada (Canadian Society of Landscape Architects)
 Australian Army Pay Corps, military unit, Australia, see Royal Australian Army Pay Corps